Ungmennafélagið Þór, commonly known as Þór Þorlákshöfn, is a multi-sport club in Þorlákshöfn, Iceland. It has active departments in athletics, badminton, basketball, motorcycle sports and track & field but has also featured various other sports, such as football and handball.

Basketball

History
On 25 June 2021, Þór men's basketball team won its first ever Icelandic championship by beating Keflavík in the Úrvalsdeild finals. Adomas Drungilas was named the Úrvalsdeild Playoffs MVP.

References

Multi-sport clubs in Iceland